The Nuli, Nuloi or Nouloi (Greek: Νυλοι, Νουλοι) were a legendary race of people with backward-facing, eight-toed feet, living on Mount Nulus in India.

Ancient sources 
The Nuli were described by Greek historian Megasthenes is the Indica. 

They also appear in Medieval bestiaries, like the Nuremberg Chronicle.

References 

Medieval European legendary creatures